Carl Fredrik Waldemar Meinander (October 6, 1916 Helsinki – August 23, 2004 Helsinki) was a Finnish archaeologist and professor of Finnish and Scandinavian archaeology at University of Helsinki in Finland. His son is Professor Henrik Meinander.

Books 
 Några forngravar i Laihela (1943)
 De österbottniska tvärlåsspännena (1949)
 Esihistoria. Etelä-Pohjanmaan historia I (1950)
 Die Bronzezeit in Finnland (1954)
 Die Kiukaiskultur (1954)
 Kolsvidja (1957)
 Smikärr (1962)
 Kommentarer till spånpålens historia (1962)
 Skifferknivar med djurskaft (1964)
 Dåvits (1969)
 Myrsbacka (1984)
 Radiokarbondateringar till Finlands stenålder (1971)
 Svenska Österbottens historia, I 
 Om introduktion av sädesodling i Finland

References 
 Finlands historia, 1 (1993)

External links
 Obituary for Carl Fredrik Meinander in Helsingin Sanomat

1916 births
2004 deaths
Academic staff of the University of Helsinki
People from Uusimaa Province (Grand Duchy of Finland)
Swedish-speaking Finns
Finnish archaeologists
20th-century archaeologists